National Tertiary Route 610, or just Route 610 (or ) is a National Road Route of Costa Rica, located in the Puntarenas province.

Description
In Puntarenas province the route covers Buenos Aires canton (Buenos Aires, Volcán, Brunka districts).

References

Highways in Costa Rica